So Uk Estate is an early public housing estate in So Uk, a hillside area of Cheung Sha Wan, Kowloon, Hong Kong. The estate has undergone redevelopment, and new housing blocks are being built in place of the ones demolished.

History

First generation
The estate was built on the site of squatter areas which were demolished for the construction of the estate of 16 blocks from 1955–1963. The blocks were called "Houses" and named after varieties of flowers. The architectural design of the estate was unique in Hong Kong. There were 5,316 flats in the original estate, with areas ranging from 19.5 to 49.1m2, with capacity of 15,200.

Planning of the estate was carried out by Eric Cumine, with buildings designed by Luke Him Sau, Chau & Lee and Leigh & Orange.

The estate was the home of many famous individuals during their youth in Hong Kong, for example, Sam Hui and his brothers, Wong Ka Kui and his brother in the band Beyond, and many others.

Second generation
By 2008, after 48 years, the estate was still in good condition but its estimated high maintenance cost made the Hong Kong Housing Authority decide to demolish the six blocks in March 2012. The Authority offered compensation and removal assistance to residents. It allowed residents the option of moving into Un Chau Estate Phases 2, 4, and 5 in Sham Shui Po.

A foundation titled, "Farewell So Uk" was established as a historical archive for the Estate and to document its history of its residents. It was sponsored by the Salvation Army of Hong Kong and the Salisbury YMCA.

As of 2015, construction of the new So Uk Estate was well underway. The new estate would comprise 14 blocks ranging from 21 to 41 storeys high with nearly 7,000 flats. The Housing Department won a Merit Award from the Hong Kong Institute of Urban Design in 2014 for their community-minded redevelopment approach.

The first phase of the redevelopment was completed in August 2016 and the intake of the first tenants was to commence at the end of September 2016.

Blocks

Old generation

Buildings closed / demolished before 2012
 Cedar House (金松樓)
 Cherry House (櫻桃樓)
 Orchid House (蘭花樓)
 Gladiolus House (劍蘭樓)
 Carnation House (石竹樓)
 Peony House (牡丹樓)
 Maple House (楓林樓)
 Willow House (綠柳樓)
 Marigold House (壽菊樓)
 Lilac House (丁香樓)

Buildings closed in 2012
 Azalea House (杜鵑樓)
 Begonia House (海棠樓)
 Camelia House (茶花樓)
 Larkspur House (彩雀樓)
 Lily House (百合樓)
 Lotus House (荷花樓)

New generation

The redeveloped estate comprises 14 blocks of 21-41 storeys each. The buildings reuse most of the names of the earlier blocks.

Estate facilities 

These include special child care centers and early education and training centers, children's homes, nursing homes for severely disabled people, comprehensive vocational rehabilitation service centers, dormitories for moderate and severely mentally handicapped persons, performance centers, children's playgrounds, basketball courts, badminton courts and parking lot. The former estate office was leased to post office for a nominal rent to replace the unrenewed Lei Cheng Uk Shopping Centre post office.

The estate has a shopping mall and is named So Uk Shopping Centre, located at the junction of Po On Road / Cheung Fat Street. The shopping mall is two floors high, with restaurants, convenience stores, restaurants, supermarkets, hair salons and other facilities. But some stores are still vacant. Schools adjacent to the estate include San Wui Commercial Society YMCA of Hong Kong Christian School etc.

Transport

The estate is adjacent to the So Uk Bus Terminus, which has remained open throughout redevelopment of the estate. It is served by several Kowloon Motor Bus and First Bus routes.

So Uk Estate is also within walking distance of Cheung Sha Wan station of the Mass Transit Railway (MTR).

See also
 Public housing estates in Cheung Sha Wan

References

External links

 Hong Kong Housing Authority
 Farewell So Uk

Public housing estates in Hong Kong
So Uk
Residential buildings completed in 1963